The 30th House of Representatives of Puerto Rico is the lower house of the 18th Legislative Assembly of Puerto Rico and will meet from January 2, 2017, to January 1, 2021. All members were elected in the General Elections of 2016. The House has a majority of members from the New Progressive Party (PNP).

The body is counterparted by the 26th Senate of Puerto Rico in the upper house.

Composition

Leadership

Non-officers

Members

Changes in membership 

 July 31, 2018: José Luis Rivera Guerra resigns from his position as representative from the 17th district.
 October 31, 2018: Wilson Román López fills the vacancy left by José Luis Rivera Guerra as representative for District 17th for the New Progressive Party (PNP).

Commissions

Standing commissions

! scope=col style="text-align: left" | Name
! scope=col style="text-align: left" | President
! scope=col style="text-align: left" | Vice President
! scope=col style="text-align: left" | Secretary
|-
| Agriculture, Natural Resources, and Environmental Affairs
| Joel I. Franqui Atiles
| Félix G. Lassalle Toro
| Michael A. Quiñones Irizarry
|-
| Calendars and Special Rules of Debate
| Gabriel Rodríguez Aguiló
| Urayoán Hernández Alvarado
| José E. Torres Zamora
|-
| Consumer, Banking and Insurance Affairs
| Yashira Lebrón Rodríguez
| Victor L. Parés Otero
| Néstor A. Alonso Vega
|-
| Cooperatives
| José A. Banchs Alemán
| Juan O. Morales Rodríguez
| Yashira Lebrón Rodríguez
|-
| Development of the Capital City and Youth Affairs
| Eddie Charbonier Chinea
| Jorge Navarro Suárez
| Juan O. Morales Rodríguez
|-
| Economic Development Planning, Telecommunications, Public-Private Partnerships and Energy
| Victor L. Parés Otero
| Antonio L. Soto Torres
| Eddie Charbonier Chinea
|-
| Education, Arts and Culture
| Guillermo Miranda Rivera
| Rafael Rivera Ortega
| Angel R. Peña Ramírez
|-
| Ethics
| José A. Banchs Alemán
| Luis Pérez Ortiz
| Samuel Pagán Cuadrado
|-
| Federal, International and Status Affairs
| José F. Aponte Hernández
| José E. Meléndez Ortiz
| María M. Charbonier Laureano
|-
| Government
| Jorge Navarro Suárez
| Antonio L. Soto Torres
| Angel R. Peña Ramírez
|-
| Health
| Juan O. Morales Rodríguez
| María M. Charbonier Laureano
| Néstor A. Alonso Vega
|-
| Housing and Urban Development
| Luis Pérez Ortiz
| Jacqueline Rodríguez Hernández
| Angel Bulerín Ramos
|-
| Integrated Development of the Eastern Region
| Angel R. Peña Ramírez
| Samuel Pagán Cuadrado
| María M. Charbonier Laureano
|-
| Integrated Development of the Northeastern Region
| Samuel Pagán Cuadrado
| Angel R. Peña Ramírez
| María de Lourdes Ramos Rivera
|-
| Integrated Development of the North Central Region
| Michael A. Quiñones Irizarry
| Rafael Rivera Ortega
| Félix G. Lassalle Toro
|-
| Integrated Development of the South Center Region
| Ramón L. Rodríguez Ruiz
| Jacqueline Rodríguez Hernández
| José A. Banchs Alemán
|-
| Integrated Development of the Southern Region
| Jacqueline Rodríguez Hernández
| Víctor M. Torres González
| José A. Banchs Alemán
|-
| Integrated Development of the Western Region
| Maricarmen Mas Rodríguez
| José J. Pérez Cordero
| José Luis Rivera Guerra
|-
| Internal Affairs
| Pedro J. Santiago Guzman
| Angel Bulerín Ramos
| Angel R. Peña Ramírez
|-
| Judiciary
| María M. Charbonier Laureano
| José E. Meléndez Ortiz
| Angel R. Peña Ramírez
|-
| Labor Affairs
| Angel R. Peña Ramírez
| Michael A. Quiñones Irizarry
| Yashira Lebrón Rodríguez
|-
| Municipal Affairs and Regionalization
| José O. González Mercado
| Víctor M. Torres González
| Yashira Lebrón Rodríguez
|-
| Public Safety
| Félix G. Lassalle Toro
| Luis Pérez Ortiz
| Eddie Charbonier Chinea
|-
| Retirement System and Veteran Affairs
| María de Lourdes Ramos Rivera
| Guillermo Miranda Rivera
| Maricarmen Mas Rodríguez
|-
| Small and Medium Businesses, and Commerce
| Nelson Del Valle Colón
| Joel I. Franqui Atiles
| Jorge Navarro Suárez
|-
| Social Welfare and Tourism
| Néstor A. Alonso Vega
| Eddie Charbonier Chinea
| Guillermo Miranda Rivera
|-
| Special Needs Education and People with Disabilities
| Rafael Rivera Ortega
| Néstor A. Alonso Vega
| Guillermo Miranda Rivera
|-
| Transportation and Infrastructure
| José Luis Rivera Guerra
| Luis Pérez Ortiz
| Félix G. Lassalle Toro
|-
| Treasury, Budget and Supervision, Management, and Economic Stability of Puerto Rico (PROMESA)
| Antonio L. Soto Torres
| Luis Pérez Ortiz
| Eddie Charbonier Chinea
|-
| Women's Affairs
| María de Lourdes Ramos Rivera
| Yashira Lebrón Rodríguez
| Pedro J. Santiago Guzman
|-
| Youth Affairs, Recreation and Sports
| José J. Pérez Cordero
| Ramón L. Rodríguez Ruiz
| Félix G. Lassalle Toro
|-

Joint commissions

! scope=col style="text-align: left" | Name
! scope=col style="text-align: left" | President
! scope=col style="text-align: left" | Vice President
! scope=col style="text-align: left" | Secretary
|-
| Córdova Fernós Program of Congressional Internships
| Eddie Charbonier Chinea
|
|
|-
| Continuous Revision of the Penal Code and for the Reform of Criminal Laws
| María M. Charbonier Laureano
| José E. Meléndez Ortiz
| José E. Torres Zamora
|-
| Jorge Alberto Ramos Comas Legislative Internship Program
| Eddie Charbonier Chinea
|
|
|-
| Legislative Donations
| Antonio L. Soto Torres
| Juan O. Morales Rodríguez
| Luis Pérez Ortiz
|-
| Public-Private Partnerships of Puerto Rico
| Larry Seilhamer
|
|
|-
| Special Reports from the Comptroller
| José A. Banchs Alemán
| Maricarmen Mas Rodríguez
| Angel R. Peña Ramírez
|-

Notes

References

External links
 camaraderepresentantes.org - official site 

2017 in Puerto Rico
29